Acoustic resonance technology (ART) is an acoustic inspection technology developed by Det Norske Veritas over the past 20 years. ART exploits the phenomenon of half-wave resonance, whereby a suitably excited resonant target (such as a pipeline wall) exhibits longitudinal resonances at certain frequencies characteristic of the target's thickness. Knowing the speed of sound in the target material, the half-wave resonant frequencies can be used to calculate the target's thickness.

ART differs from traditional ultrasonic testing: although both are forms of nondestructive testing based on acoustics, ART generally uses lower frequencies and has a wider bandwidth. This has enabled its use in gaseous environments without a liquid couplant.

Det Norske Veritas has licensed the technology for use in on-shore water pipes worldwide to Breivoll Inspection Technologies AS. Breivoll has proven the efficiency of the technology in assessing the condition of metallic water pipes, both with and without coating. The company has since 2008 successfully developed a method to enter and inspect water mains, and is a world-leader in their market.

ART has also been used in field tests at Gassco's Kårstø facility.

In 2012 DNV's ART activities were spun out into a subsidiary HalfWave.

Main features
 Uses lower frequencies than ultrasonic testing
 Effective in gases and liquids (i.e. requires no liquid couplant)
 Can be used to characterize multi-layered media (e.g. pipelines with coatings)
 Can penetrate coatings
 Can measure inside and outside metal loss

RUV (resonance ultrasonic vibrations)

In a closely related technique, the presence of cracks in a solid structure can be detected by looking for differences in resonance frequency, bandwidth and resonance amplitude compared to a nominally identical but non-cracked structure. This technique, called RUV (Resonance Ultrasonic Vibrations), has been developed for use in the photovoltaics industry by a group of researchers from the University of South Florida, Ultrasonic Technologies Inc. (Florida, US), and Isofoton S.A. (Spain). The method was able to detect mm-size cracks in as-cut and processed silicon wafers, as well as finished solar cells, with a total test time of under 2 seconds per wafer.

References 

Quality
Nondestructive testing
Casting (manufacturing)
Ultrasound